Jack Levi Maloney (born 8 December 1994) is an English professional footballer who plays for Horndean as a midfielder or as a winger.

Career

Portsmouth
Maloney was born in Ryde, and played in Oakfield Youth FC when the club was managed by his father, Carlos. He joined Portsmouth Academy when he was nine, after impressing in a Portsmouth School Of Excellence placed in Ryde.

On 9 February 2011, Maloney signed a two-year scholarship with Pompey. On 14 August 2012, he made his debut in the League Cup in a 3–0 defeat at Plymouth Argyle coming on as a 34th-minute substitute for injured Ashley Westwood. Although he then spent most of the season with the Academy, Maloney was again promoted to the first-team squad on 7 March 2013. He made his league debut for Portsmouth two days later, in a 2–0 win against Bury, coming off the bench to replace David Connolly in the dying minutes of the match.

On 23 August 2013, Maloney was loaned to Aldershot in a one-month deal. After being sparingly used, he returned to Portsmouth and appeared as a last-minute substitute in a 1–2 home loss against Southend United on 26 November.

On 7 February of the following year, Maloney joined Lewes also in a one-month loan. On 24 October 2014 he moved to Poole Town, again on loan.

On 17 March 2015 Maloney was released by Portsmouth, and signed for Bognor Regis Town just hours later.

On 5 December 2015 days after signing from Salisbury, Maloney made his debut for Horndean in a 2–0 home win against Whitchurch United, coming on early in the second half to replace his brother Josh.

Career statistics

References

External links
Player profile on Portsmouth's official website

Living people
1994 births
People from Ryde
English footballers
Association football forwards
Portsmouth F.C. players
Aldershot Town F.C. players
Lewes F.C. players
Poole Town F.C. players
Bognor Regis Town F.C. players
Salisbury F.C. players
Horndean F.C. players
English Football League players
National League (English football) players